Leonards may refer to:

Places
United States

Leonards, Florida
Leonards, Wisconsin, an unincorporated community
Leonards Point, Wisconsin, an unincorporated community

See also
Leonard (disambiguation)
St Leonards (disambiguation)